Guillermo Francisco Reyes González (born October 26, 1965) is a Colombian lawyer, writer and academic. Since August 11, 2022, he has held the position of Minister of Transportation of his country, under the government of Gustavo Petro. Previously he was Vice Minister of the Interior and Justice, Counselor Minister of the Colombian Embassy before the United Nations and President of the National Electoral Council.

Early life
He graduated as a lawyer from the Faculty of Jurisprudence of the Universidad del Rosario de Colombia in 1989 and specialized in Tax Law at the same university, while he was part of the creation of the Séptima balloteta movement, which led him to be an advisor in the Constituent Assembly of Colombia in 1991.  In 2010 he obtained his Diploma in Advanced Studies - DEA in Philosophy of Law from the Complutense University of Madrid and, in 2015, he received the degree of Doctor of Law with a mention in Philosophy of Law, Moral and Politics and Outstanding Cum Laude degree from the same university.

In August 1992, he was appointed Assistant Magistrate of the Constitutional Court of Colombia, where he served until February 2000, when he resigned to serve as Rector of the Catholic University of Colombia, between March 2000 and July 2001, and served as Dean of the Faculty of law between April 2009 and May 2011, at the same institution.

As counselor minister of the Colombian Embassy before the United Nations, he served as vice president of the Commission of Non-Governmental Organizations of the Economic and Social Council of the United Nations (ECOSOC), between 2001 and 2002, and was coordinator of the Human Rights Commission of Nations in New York in 2002, Vice President of the United Nations Commission on International Trade Law and Vice President of the Commission on Privileges and Immunities of State Agents.

References

External links 

|-

1965 births
Living people
Ministers of Transport of Colombia
Cabinet of Gustavo Petro
21st-century Colombian politicians
Del Rosario University alumni
Rectors of universities in Colombia
People from Santander Department